Cristian Zúñiga (born 7 May 1992) is a Colombian footballer who is first cousin of Colombian player Camilo Zúñiga who currently plays for San Francisco F. C. in Panama.

Career

Zúñiga started his senior career with Leones FC of Colombia. After that, he played for San Francisco in Panama. In January 2020, he signed for Alianza Lima in the Peruvian Primera División, where he has made 12 appearances and scored zero goals.

References

External links 

Cristian David Zuñiga Pino at Soccerway

Colombian footballers
Club Alianza Lima footballers
San Francisco F.C. players
1992 births
Living people
Association football forwards
Footballers from Cali